Burgersdorp is a medium-sized town in Walter Sisulu in the Joe Gqabi District Municipality of the Eastern Cape province of South Africa.

In 1869 a Theological Seminary was established here by the Gereformeerde Kerk, but in 1905 it was moved to Potchefstroom, acting as an instrument in the formation of the PUK in 1919, then becoming the Potchefstroom University for Christian Higher Education in 1951.

The Afrikaner Bond political party was founded in Burgersdorp in 1881.

Demographics
According to the 2011 census, the town of Burgersdorp proper has a population of 5,240, while the adjacent townships of Mzamomhle and Tembisa have populations of 4,656 and 6,094 respectively, giving the urban area a population of 15,990. Of this population 78.1% described themselves as Black African, 11.98% as Coloured and 9.4% as White. 69.2% spoke Xhosa as their home language, 20.1% spoke Afrikaans, 3.3% spoke Sotho, 1.4% spoke English as their home language and 6.0% spoke some other language.

Transport

Rail
The first rail connection to Burgersdorp was opened on 19 March 1885. Today Shosholoza Meyl provides passenger rail service to Burgersdorp on its Johannesburg-Bloemfontein-East London route.

Road
Burgersdorp is located on the junction of the R58 between Aliwal North and Venterstad; and the R391 leading to Hofmeyr, Molteno and Steynsburg.

Society

Sport
Match 18 of the 1910 British Lions tour to South Africa was played in Burgersdorp.

Museums, monuments and memorials
Ten of the Eastern Cape's provincial heritage sites can be found in Burgersdorp. They include the Christ Church, the Coetzee House, the De Bruin House, the Jubilee Fountain, the Old Goal, the Old Reformed Church Parsonage, the Old Reformed Church Theological Seminary as well as the three listed below in more detail.

Dutch Reformed Church
This church was declared a provincial heritage site in 1996.

Blockhouse

A Second Boer War blockhouse overlooking the town, commonly known as the Sentinel was declared a provincial heritage site in 1939.

Dutch Language Monument

A monument to Dutch, built in 1893 is located in the town. The monument depicts a woman pointing her finger at a book in her hands. This monument was declared a provincial heritage site in 1937.

Although the main inscription on that monument refers to the Hollandse taal (Dutch language), it can be understood to mean Afrikaans, because the Hollandse taal in South Africa was only split since 1925. But the monument is officially recognised as a monument to Dutch.

The monument was damaged during the Anglo-Boer War, and Lord Milner had it removed. It was replaced with a replica in 1907. The original was later discovered in King William's Town in 1939, and moved back to stand next to the replica in Burgersdorp.

Some sources claim that Lord Milner had removed the original monument not because it was damaged, but because he was opposed to Dutch (and Afrikaans), and that the replica was built not by government but by a group of Afrikaners.

Education

Burgersdorp has 5 primary schools and 2 high schools

PRIMARY SCHOOLS*

Mzimkhulu Primary School

Mpumelelo Mfundisi Public Primary School

Maruping Primary School

Eureka Primary School

Burgersdorp Laerskool

HIGH SCHOOLS*

Ethembeni Senior Secondary School

Burgersdorp Hoerskool

References

External links

 Hoërskool Burgersdorp
 Laerskool Burgersdorp
 Burgersdorp.za.net
 Name of Burgersdorp, Dictionary of Southern African Place Names, Raper P.E., 1987

Populated places in the Walter Sisulu Local Municipality
Populated places established in 1846
Populated places founded by Afrikaners
1846 establishments in the British Empire